Kim Youngsun is a South Korean voice artist who joined the Munhwa Broadcasting Corporation's Voice Acting Division in 1996. He is the official Korean dub-over voice artist for Elijah Wood. He is married to fellow voice actress Bak So-ra.

Roles

Video Games
Professor Layton as Professor Hershel Layton
Elsword as Ciel
King's Raid as Roi
Grand Chase as Zero
Mystic Messenger as 707
MapleStory as Will, Albaire, Limbo, Elwin, White Mage (Borderless/Convergence), Tai Yu, Ryan
After L!fe as Noah
Wannabe Challenge as Kim Taehee
Cookie Run: Kingdom as Sparkling Cookie

Broadcast TV
CatDog(JEI TV)-Dog
Zoids-Van
Smallville (TV series) (replaced Tom Welling, Korea TV Edition, MBC)
Death Note(Anione)- Light Yagami
CSI: Crime Scene Investigation (replaced George Eads, Korea TV Edition, MBC)
Buffy the Vampire Slayer (replacing David Boreanaz, Korea TV Edition, MBC)
Mirmo! (Mirmo Pong Pong Pong, Korea TV Edition, SBS)
Shadow Fighter (MBC)
Rexa 3 Country (MBC)
Hit 30 Years (Radio Drama, MBC)
Cartoon Fight (Radio Drama in Redmoon (manga), MBC)
Ojamajo Doremi (Korea TV Edition, MBC) 
Ragnarok The Animation (Korea TV Edition, SBS) 
Spheres (anime) (MBC)- Jin
Nalong (MBC)
Nalong 2 (MBC)
Reply's Fighter (Korea TV Edition, MBC)
Inspect Bruno (Korea TV Edition, MBC)
Dolphin Plipper (Korea TV Edition, MBC)
Gangbada (Korea TV Edition, MBC)
Jimmy Neutron (Korea TV Edition, MBC)
Beyblade (Top Blade, Korea TV Edition, SBS) - Kai Hiwatari
Naruto (Korea TV Edition, Tooniverse) - Sasuke Uchiha
Saiyuki (Korea TV Edition, Anione TV) - Son Goku
Fate/stay night (Korea TV Edition, Animax) (Korea TV Edition,) - Shirō Emiya
 Bleach (Korea TV Edition, Animax)  – Uryū Ishida
Viva Pinata(Animax)-Polly
RomeoXJuliet(Animax)-Romio
Teenage Mutant Ninja Turtles(Nickelodeon) - Leonardo
 Ben 10 series - ben tennyson (15~16 year old) including Ben 10: Alien force, Ben 10: Ultimate Alien, Ben 10: Omniverse
 One Punch Man - Saitama(blu-ray version)
 Titans (2018 TV series)(Netflix) - hank hall

Movie dubbing
Impossible (replacing Tom Cruise, Korea TV Edition, MBC) 
The Bourne Identity (replacing Matt Damon, Korea TV Edition, MBC)
Primal Fear (replacing Edward Norton, Korea TV Edition, MBC)
Election (replacing Matthew Broderick, Korea TV Edition, MBC)
The Man in the Iron Mask (replacing Leonardo DiCaprio, Korea TV Edition, MBC)
The Butterfly Effect (replacing Ashton Kutcher, Korea TV Edition, MBC)
Before Sunrise (replacing Ethan Hawke, Korea TV Edition, SBS)
The Lord of the Rings (The Lord of the Rings (film series), replacing Elijah Wood, Korea TV Edition, SBS)
Eternal Sunshine of the Spotless Mind (replacing Elijah Wood, Korea TV Edition SBS)
Bobby (replacing Elijah Wood, Korea TV Edition SBS)
Young Winston (replacing Simon Ward, Korea TV Edition, MBC)
Starship Troopers (film) (replacing Casper Van Dien, Korea TV Edition, SBS)
About a Boy (film) (replacing Hugh Grant, Korea TV Edition, MBC)
S.W.A.T. (film) (replacing Colin Farrell, Korea TV Edition, MBC)
I Spy (film) (replacing Owen Wilson, Korea TV Edition, MBC)
The Rundown (Korea name is Welcome to Jungle, replacing Seann William Scott, Korea TV Edition, MBC)
Shanghai Knights (replacing Owen Wilson, Korea TV Edition, MBC)
The Day After Tomorrow (replacing Jake Gyllenhaal, Korea TV Edition, MBC)
Pirates of the Caribbean: The Curse of the Black Pearl (replacing Orlando Bloom, Korea TV Edition, MBC)
House of Flying Daggers (replacing Takeshi Kaneshiro, Korea TV Edition, MBC)
A Fairly Odd Movie: Grow Up, Timmy Turner! (replacing Drake Bell, Korea TV Edition, EBS)
Spirited Away (replacing Haku)
Howl’s Moving Castle (replacing Takuya Kimura)
Professor Layton and the Eternal Diva (replacing Yo Oizumi)

See also
Munhwa Broadcasting Corporation
MBC Voice Acting Division

References

External links
Daum Cafe Voice Actor Kim Youngsun's Homepage 

Living people
South Korean male voice actors
Year of birth missing (living people)